Falls of Clyde may refer to:
Falls of Clyde (waterfalls), Scottish waterfalls
, British sailing ship, later an American oil tanker and museum
 The Falls of Clyde, a melodrama by George Soane (1817)